Emilia Alina Vuc (born 4 October 1993) is a Romanian freestyle wrestler. She is a two-time silver medalist at the World Wrestling Championships and a four-time medalist at the European Wrestling Championships. She competed in the women's freestyle 48 kg event at the 2016 Summer Olympics, in which she was eliminated in the round of 16 by Vinesh Phogat. She also represented Romania in the women's 50 kg event at the 2020 Summer Olympics held in Tokyo, Japan.

Career 

In 2018, she won one of the bronze medals in the women's 50 kg event at the Klippan Lady Open in Klippan, Sweden. In 2021, she won the bronze medal in the 50 kg event at the Matteo Pellicone Ranking Series 2021 held in Rome, Italy. In October 2021, she lost her bronze medal match in the women's 50 kg event at the World Wrestling Championships in Oslo, Norway.

In 2022, she won the gold medal in the 50 kg event at the Yasar Dogu Tournament held in Istanbul, Turkey. In March 2022, she won one of the bronze medals in the 50 kg event at the European Wrestling Championships held in Budapest, Hungary. She lost her bronze medal match in the women's 50kg event at the 2022 World Wrestling Championships held in Belgrade, Serbia.

Achievements

References

External links 

 

1993 births
Living people
Romanian female sport wrestlers
Olympic wrestlers of Romania
Wrestlers at the 2016 Summer Olympics
Wrestlers at the 2020 Summer Olympics
World Wrestling Championships medalists
European Wrestling Championships medalists
21st-century Romanian women